The 2021 Hungarian Darts Trophy was the first PDC European Tour event on the 2021 PDC Pro Tour. The tournament took place at the László Papp Budapest Sports Arena, Budapest, Hungary from 3–5 September 2021. It featured a field of 47 players and £140,000 in prize money, with £25,000 going to the winner.

Gerwyn Price became the inaugural champion after defeating Michael Smith 8–2 in the final, winning his 4th European Tour title.

This was the first PDC tournament held in Hungary; the tournament was originally scheduled to take place in 2020, but was cancelled due to the COVID-19 pandemic.

Prize money
This is how the prize money was divided, with the prize money being unchanged from the 2019 & 2020 European Tours:

 Seeded players who lose in the second round do not receive this prize money on any Orders of Merit.

Qualification and format
The top 16 entrants from the PDC ProTour Order of Merit on 28 June automatically qualified for the event and were seeded in the second round.

The remaining 32 places went to players from six qualifying events – 24 from the Tour Card Holder Qualifier (held on 9 July), one from the UK Associate Member Qualifier (held on 9 August), one from the European Associate Member Qualifier (held on 5 July), four from the Host Nation Qualifier (as there are no Hungarian Tour Card holders) (held on 31 July), one from the Nordic & Baltic Associate Member Qualifier (held in early 2020, and carried over), and one from the East European Associate Member Qualifier (held in 2020 and carried over).

Danny Noppert withdrew prior to the tournament, which meant Rob Cross became a seed, and a random player was drawn to receive a  bye to round two. That player was William O'Connor.

The following players took part in the tournament:

Top 16
  (quarter-finals)
  (semi-finals)
  (quarter-finals)
  (third round)
  (winner)
  (runner-up)
  (second round)
  (third round)
  (second round)
  (second round)
  (second round)
  (third round)
  (quarter-finals)
  (second round)
  (third round)
  (third round)

Tour Card Qualifier
  (second round)
  (second round)
  (third round)
  (second round)
  (first round)
  (second round)
  (second round)
  (second round)
  (first round)
  (first round)
  (first round)
  (second round)
  (first round)
  (semi-finals)  (third round, withdrew)  (first round)  (second round)  (first round)  (second round)  (first round)  (second round)  (first round)  (third round)UK Associate Member Qualifier
  (first round)European Associate Member Qualifier
  (second round)Host Nation Qualifier
  (first round)  (first round)  (first round)  (first round)Nordic & Baltic Qualifier
  (first round)East European Qualifier
  (quarter-finals)''

Draw

1William Borland withdrew due to a personal issue. Therefore, Peter Wright received a bye into the quarter-finals.

References

2021 PDC Pro Tour
2021 PDC European Tour
2021 in Hungarian sport
Hungarian Darts Trophy